CHEK2 (Checkpoint kinase 2) is a tumor suppressor gene that encodes the protein CHK2, a serine-threonine kinase. CHK2 is involved in DNA repair, cell cycle arrest or apoptosis in response to DNA damage. Mutations to the CHEK2 gene have been linked to a wide range of cancers.

Gene location 

The CHEK2 gene is located on the long (q) arm of chromosome 22 at position 12.1. Its location on chromosome 22 stretches from base pair 28,687,742 to base pair 28,741,904.

Protein structure 

The CHEK2 protein encoded by the CHEK2 gene is a serine threonine kinase. The protein consists of 543 amino acids and the following domains:
 N-terminal SQ/TQ cluster domain (SCD)
 Central forkhead-associated (FHA) domain
 C-terminal serine/threonine kinase domain (KD)

The SCD domain contains multiple SQ/TQ motifs that serve as sites for phosphorylation in response to DNA damage. The most notable and frequently phosphorylated site being Thr68.

CHK2 appears as a monomer in its inactive state. However, in the event of DNA damage SCD phosphorylation causes CHK2 dimerization. The phosphorylated Thr68 (located on the SCD) interacts with the FHA domain to form the dimer. After the protein dimerizes the KD is activated via autophosphorylation. Once the KD is activated the CHK2 dimer dissociates.

Function and mechanism 

The CHEK2 gene encodes for checkpoint kinase 2 (CHK2), a protein that acts a tumor suppressor. CHK2 regulates cell division, and has the ability to prevent cells from dividing too rapidly or in an uncontrolled manner.

When DNA undergoes a double-strand break, CHK2 is activated. Specifically, DNA damage-activated phosphatidylinositol kinase family protein (PIKK) ATM phosphorylates site Thr68 and activates CHK2. Once activated, CHK2 phosphorylates downstream targets including CDC25 phosphatases, responsible for dephosphorylating and activating the cyclin-dependent kinases (CDKs). Thus, CHK2's inhibition of the CDC25 phosphatases prevents entry of the cell into mitosis. Furthermore, the CHK2 protein interacts with several other proteins including p53 (p53). Stabilization of p53 by CHK2 leads to cell cycle arrest in phase G1. Furthermore, CHK2 is known to phosphorylate the cell-cycle transcription factor E2F1 and the promyelocytic leukemia protein (PML) involved in apoptosis (programmed cell death).

Association with cancer 

The CHK2 protein plays a critical role in the DNA damage checkpoint. Thus, mutations to the CHEK2 gene have been labeled as causes to a wide range of cancers.

In 1999, genetic variations of CHEK2 were found to correspond to inherited cancer susceptibility.

Bell et al. (1999) discovered three CHEK2 germline mutations among four Li–Fraumeni syndrome (LFS) and 18 Li–Fraumeni-like (LFL) families. Since the time of this discovery, two of the three variants (a deletion in the kinase domain in exon 10 and a missense mutation in the FHA domain in exon 3) have been linked to inherited susceptibility to breast as well as other cancers.

Beyond initial speculations, screening of LFS and LFL patients has revealed no or very rare individual missense variants in the CHEK2 gene. Additionally, the deletion in the kinase domain on exon 10 has been found rare among LFS/LFL patients. The evidence from these studies has suggests that CHEK2 is not a predisposition gene to Li–Fraumeni syndrome.

Breast cancer 

Inherited mutations in the CHEK2 gene have been linked to certain cases of breast cancer. Most notably, the deletion of a single DNA nucleotide at position 1100 in exon 10 (1100delC) produces a nonfunctional version of the CHK2 protein, truncated at the kinase domain. The loss of normal CHK2 protein function leads to unregulated cell division, accumulated damage to DNA and in many cases, tumor development. The CHEK2*1100del mutation is most commonly seen in individuals of Eastern and Northern European descent. Within these populations the CHEK2*1100delC mutation is seen in 1 out of 100 to 1 out of 200 individuals. However, in North America the frequency drops to 1 out of 333 to 1 out of 500. The mutation is almost absent in Spain and India. Studies show that a CHEK2 1100delC corresponds to a two-fold increased risk of breast cancer and a 10-fold increased risk of breast cancer in males.

A CHEK2 mutation known as the I157T variant to the FHA domain in exon 3 has also been linked to breast cancer but at a lower risk than the CHEK2*1100delC mutation. The estimated fraction of breast cancer attributed to this variant is reported to be around 1.2% in the US.

Two more CHEK2 gene mutations, CHEK2*S428F, an amino-acid substitution to the kinase domain in exon 11 and CHEK2*P85L, an amino-acid substitution in the N-terminal region (exon 1) have been found in the Ashkenazi Jewish population. Suggestion of a Hispanic founder mutation has also been described.

Other cancers 

Mutations to CHEK2 have been found in hereditary and nonhereditary cases of cancer. Studies link the mutation to cases of prostate, lung, colon, kidney, and thyroid cancers. Links have also been drawn to certain brain tumors and osteosarcoma.

Unlike BRCA1 and BRCA2 mutations, CHEK2 mutations do not appear to cause an elevated risk for ovarian cancer. However, a large-effect genome-wide association for squamous lung cancer has been described for a rare variant in CHEK2 (p.Ile157Thr, rs17879961, OR = 0.38).

Meiosis 

CHEK2 regulates cell cycle progression and spindle assembly during mouse oocyte maturation and early embryo development. Although CHEK2 is a down stream effector of the ATM kinase that responds primarily to double-strand breaks it can also be activated by ATR (ataxia-telangiectasia and Rad3 related) kinase that responds primarily to single-strand breaks. In mice, CHEK2 is essential for DNA damage surveillance in female meiosis.  The response of oocytes to DNA double-strand break damage involves a pathway hierarchy in which ATR kinase signals to CHEK2 which then activates p53 and p63 proteins.

In the fruit fly Drosophila, irradiation of germ line cells generates double-strand breaks that result in cell cycle arrest and apoptosis.  The Drosophila CHEK2 ortholog mnk and the p53 ortholog dp53 are required for much of the cell death observed in early oogenesis when oocyte selection and meiotic recombination occur.

Interactions 

CHEK2 has been shown to interact with:

 BRCA1
 GINS2 
 MDC1 
 MSH2 
 MUS81 
 PLK1
 PLK3

References

Further reading

External links 
Educational resources 
Gene Reviews
Gene Tests

 
 

EC 2.7.11
Tumor suppressor genes